Demetria is a given name, the feminine form of the Greek name Demetrius, which means "follower of Demeter". Variations of Demetria include Demetri, Dem, Demet, Demetra, Metra and Demi; the common diminutive form of the name is also used as a nickname for Demetria.

People named Demetria include:

 St. Demetria (died 362), Christian martyr and saint
 Demetria Kalodimos, American anchorperson
 Demi Lovato (born 1992), American actor, singer and songwriter
 Demetria McKinney, American actress, singer and songwriter
 Demetria Royals, American director, producer and editor
 Demetria Sance (born 1977), American former indoor volleyball player
 Demetria Taylor (born 1973), American Chicago blues singer and songwriter
 Demetria Washington (born 1979), American former sprinter

Notes

Given names of Greek language origin
Greek feminine given names
English feminine given names